Anne Elwood (née Curteis, 1796 – 24 February 1873) was a British traveller, writer and biographer. It was claimed that she was the first woman to travel overland from Britain to India.

Life
Anne was born in 1796 to Edward Jeremiah Curteis, a writer and an independent Member of Parliament for Sussex, and his wife Mary Curteis. They lived near Battle.

She married on 9 January 1824 to Major Charles William Elwood. He was about 15 years older than her and he had worked for many years for the East India Company. The couple set off for India in 1825 and it was claimed that she was the first female to travel overland to India. She described her journey using the device of letters home which she published as Narrative of a Journey Overland from England to India in 1830. The book described her journey to India via Egypt and it was illustrated by her and her husband. She advised on the need for three days of underwear, riding habits and several evening dresses.
Elwood's book also included not only descriptions of her time in India when her husband was leading a regiment, but also the couple's return to England in 1828 by sea.

Her second book was also remarkable. Elwood says that she could not find a book about women writers and so she decided to write one. Memoirs of the Literary Ladies of England from the Commencement of the Last Century was published in 1841 and it described the life of 29 leading women. Elwood knew several of the women and she was given access to their documents. The book was well regarded and was used as a source for the Dictionary of National Biography. Her writing was not always objective. She included Emma Roberts in her leading women who had later travelled to India. Elwood thought her journey of two months was too fast.

Elwood died in Clayton Priory in 1873.

Works
Narrative of a Journey Overland from England (1830)
volume I
volume II
Memoirs of the Literary Ladies of England (1845)

References

1796 births
1873 deaths
British travel writers
British biographers
British India
19th-century British women writers
19th-century British writers
Women biographers
British women travel writers